Iota Mensae is a single star about  away in the faint constellation Mensa. It has a very slightly variable apparent magnitude of 6.0, making it visible with the naked eye under good skies. 

Iota Mensae has a spectral type of B8III, indicating that it has exhausted hydrogen at its core and expanded away from the main sequence. It is about 3.6 times the mass, 301 times as luminous, and has swollen to 9.5 times the radius of the Sun.  It is calculated to be 314 million years old.  

It has been catalogued as a chemically peculiar star with abnormally strong lines of silicon in its spectrum but this classification is now considered doubtful.  Its brightness varies by a few hundredths of a magnitude.  Its period was initially measured at 2.6 days, but this is now considered to be a period of 5.3 days with primary and secondary minima of a similar depth.  The variability is thought to be due to the rotation of the star.

References 

Mensa (constellation)
Iota, Epsilon
026264
1991
038602
B-type giants
Rotating ellipsoidal variables
Durchmusterung objects